Gothic religion may refer to:

Gothic paganism
Gothic Christianity

See also
Gothic art, for high medieval religious expression